AnimeTrax is a joint venture between ADV Films and The Right Stuf International to distribute anime soundtracks (often called OSTs) in the United States.  In 2003 ADV Films formed their own music division to serve the same purpose in the form of ADV Music.  AnimeTrax's catalog includes soundtracks from Slayers, Martian Successor Nadesico, Lost Universe, Samurai X (Rurouni Kenshin: Tsuiokuhen), Boogiepop Phantom, Macross II, Macross Plus, Akira and The Irresponsible Captain Tylor.

See also 
 List of record labels

External links
 Official site
 ADV Films
 The Right Stuf International

Anime soundtracks
American record labels